Leiopterella is a genus of prehistoric eurypterid of the family Rhenopteridae. It contains one species, Leiopterella tetliei, from the Early Devonian of Nunavut, Canada. The name is said to be derived from the Greek leios (meaning "smooth") and pteros (meaning "wing", a suffix traditionally applied to many eurypterid genera). The proper word for wing in ancient Greek is however pteron (πτερόν). The species name honors Dr. O. Erik Tetlie for his contributions to the study of fossil eurypterids.

Description 
Leiopterella is defined as a rhenopterid with a turbinate carapace lacking a cuticular sculpture. The ventral sutures resemble those of Eurypterus and the gnathobases are large and robust. The genus possesses a short type-B genital appendage with a bi-lobed termination.

The holotype (and only published) specimen, CMN 53573, measures 37 mm long and 29 mm wide and consists of the prosoma, four opisthosomal segments, a faintly preserved metasoma, portions of the prosomal appendages and the genital appendage.

Classification 
Historically, Leiopterella was classified as a rhenopterid closely related to Rhenopterus and more derived than basal rhenopterids such as Brachyopterus and Brachyopterella. However, a 2021 study concluded that Leiopterella was more basal than previously thought.

See also 
 List of eurypterids

References 

Devonian eurypterids
Fossils of Canada
Eurypterids of North America
Rhenopteroidea